Joe Bonner (April 20, 1948 – November 20, 2014) was a hard bop and modal jazz pianist, influenced by McCoy Tyner and Art Tatum.

He was born in Rocky Mount, North Carolina and studied at Virginia State College, but indicated that he learned more about music from musicians he worked with. In the seventies he played with Roy Haynes, Freddie Hubbard, Woody Shaw and Billy Harper, among others.

He died of heart disease in Denver at the age of 66.

Discography

As leader

Compilation
Two & One (Steeplechase); with Johnny Dyani (bass)

As sideman
With Richard Davis
 Epistrophy & Now's the Time (Muse, 1972)
With Billy Harper
 Black Saint (Black Saint, 1975)
With Azar Lawrence
 Bridge into the New Age (Prestige, 1974)
With Barbara Paris
 Where Butterflies Play (Perea Productions, 1992)
 P.S. I Love You (Perea Productions, 12/10/2000)
 Happy Talk (Perea Productions, 2002)
With Pharoah Sanders
 Black Unity (Impulse!, 1971)
 Live at the East (Impulse!, 1972)
 Village of the Pharoahs (Impulse!, 1973)
 Elevation (Impulse!, 1973)
 Love in Us All (Impulse!, 1972–73)
 Wisdom Through Music (Impulse!, 1973)
 Journey to the One (Theresa, 1980)
 Rejoice (Theresa, 1981)
With Woody Shaw
 Love Dance (Muse, 1975)
With Harold Vick
 Don't Look Back (Strata-East, 1974)
With The Visitors
 Motherland (Muse, 1975)
With Stephanie Hancock
 This Happy Madness (DaJazz, 2001)

References

External links
The Bonner Party's site
Artist direct

1948 births
2014 deaths
American jazz pianists
American male pianists
Virginia State University alumni
SteepleChase Records artists
Muse Records artists
20th-century American pianists
Jazz musicians from Virginia
20th-century American male musicians
American male jazz musicians